Hot on the Tracks is the fourth studio album by the Commodores, released by Motown Records in 1976. It includes the Top Ten pop single "Just to Be Close to You". The album was the band's first #1 album on the R&B albums chart.

Covers and Samples
"Girl, I Think the World About You" was sampled by De La Soul featuring the Jungle Brothers and Q Tip. "High On Sunshine" was also covered by The 5th Dimension and sampled by De La Soul and by Fat Joe.

Track listing

Side One
"Let's Get Started" -  (Lionel Richie, Milan Williams, Walter Orange, Ronald La Pread, Thomas McClary, William King) – 3:55
"Girl, I Think the World About You"  - (Lionel Richie, Thomas McClary) – 4:33
"High on Sunshine" - (Lionel Richie, Thomas McClary) – 4:25
"Just to Be Close to You" - (Lionel Richie) – 6:23

Side Two
"Fancy Dancer" (Lionel Richie, Ronald La Pread) – 3:51
"Come Inside" (Lionel Richie, Thomas McClary) – 4:26
"Thumpin' Music" (William King) – 3:26 	
"Captain Quickdraw" (Milan Williams) – 4:20
"Can't Let You Tease Me" (Walter Orange) – 3:18

Personnel 

Commodores
 Lionel Richie – vocals, saxophones, keyboards
 Milan Williams – keyboards 
 Thomas McClary – vocals, guitars
 Ronald LaPread – bass
 Walter Orange – drums, vocals, percussion
 William King – trumpet

Additional personnel
 Cal Harris – synthesizers

Production 
 Commodores – producers, arrangements 
 James Anthony Carmichael – producer, arrangements
 Benjamin Ashburn – executive producer, management 
 Cal Harris – recording, mixing 
 Jane Clark – assistant engineer 
 Jack Andrews – mastering 
 Suzee Ikeda – project manager 
 Frank Mulvey – art direction, design 
 Michael Steirnagle – illustration

Charts

Singles

See also
List of number-one R&B albums of 1976 (U.S.)

References

External links
 Commodores-Hot On The Tracks at Discogs

Commodores albums
1976 albums
Albums produced by James Anthony Carmichael
Albums produced by Lionel Richie
Motown albums